Dildar Mohammad Awan (1 November 1928 – 7 January 2000) was a Pakistani cricketer who played first-class cricket in Pakistan from 1958/59 to 1972/73. He was a right-arm off-spin bowler. He later became an umpire.

Career with Combined Services
Making his first-class debut a few weeks after turning 30, Awan took 5 for 19 and 3 for 16 in his first match, for Combined Services against Rawalpindi in December 1958. He was the most successful bowler in the Quaid-i-Azam Trophy that season, taking 25 wickets at 16.36 and helping Combined Services into the final against Karachi. Karachi won the final by 279 runs, Awan taking three wickets, but the course of the match was overshadowed by the death of the Karachi wicket-keeper Abdul Aziz. Batting late on the first day, Aziz was struck on the chest by a slow off-break from Awan, fell to the ground a moment later, never regained consciousness, and died in the ambulance on the way to hospital. Later in the season, Awan played for a Commander-in-Chief's XI against the touring West Indians, taking three wickets.

In 1961–62, bowling unchanged through each innings, he took 7 for 65 (his best innings figures) and 3 for 28 for Combined Services against Sargodha. A few days earlier he had taken 6 for 47 and 4 for 50 against Peshawar. In the second innings, he and Salahuddin bowled unchanged through an innings of 125.3 overs. Awan had match figures of 80.5–44–97–10. In the final of the Quaid-i-Azam Trophy against Karachi Blues, batting at number three in the second innings, he made his highest score, 32, the top score of the innings, but Karachi Blues won by four wickets. Awan played for a Combined XI against the touring MCC later in the season, taking two wickets in a match ruined by rain.

In 17 matches for Combined Services, he took 95 wickets at 15.50.

Later career
The Combined Services team went into abeyance after 1964–65. After two matches for Sargodha in 1964-65 and 1965-66 Awan did not play again until the inaugural matches played by the Pakistan Air Force cricket team in 1969–70 when he was 40. He was their leading wicket-taker that season, with 10 wickets at 21.30, but the side lost all three of their matches. In 1970–71 he captained Pakistan Air Force to their only victory, over his old side Sargodha, taking match figures of 33–19–58–6.

He did not play in 1971–72, but he did stand as an umpire in two of Sargodha's matches. He returned to play in one last match in 1972–73, when at the age of 44 he opened the bowling for Pakistan Air Force and took 3 for 126 off 58 overs against Lahore B.

See also 

 List of unusual deaths
 Ray Chapman, an American baseball player killed after being struck by a ball during a game. The only player in Major League Baseball history to die of an in-game injury

 List of fatal accidents in cricket

References

1928 births
2000 deaths
Pakistani cricketers
Combined Services (Pakistan) cricketers
Sargodha cricketers
Pakistan Air Force cricketers
Cricketers from Jalandhar